Late Autumn is a 2010 English-language film directed by Kim Tae-yong. It stars Tang Wei as Anna, a prisoner who is given a 72 hours parole to visit family in Seattle, and who meets and befriends a South Korean man on-the-run (Hyun Bin).

A co-production between South Korea, China and the United States, it is the fourth remake of the now-lost 1966 Lee Man-hee melodrama classic of the same title.

Plot
Washington state, US, the present day. Anna (Tang Wei), an immigrant from China, has been in prison for seven years for the manslaughter of her husband (John Woo), who was jealous over her re-meeting her former boyfriend Wang Jing (Jun-seong Kim). Hearing that her mother has died and her brother John has arranged her bail, Anna is given 72 hours parole to visit her family in Seattle. On the coach she meets a young Korean man, Hoon (Hyun Bin), who borrows  towards a ticket, and he gives her his watch as security, promising to pay her back later. Unknown to Anna, Hoon is a gigolo on the run from powerful businessman Steve (James C. Burns), who wants to kill him for having an affair with his Korean wife, Ok-ja (Jeong So-ra). Hoon meets Anna again in Seattle, and the pair spend time together. The next day he turns up at her mother's funeral, and gets into a fight with Wang at a restaurant afterwards. Anna tells him she has to return to prison on time, but Hoon doesn't give up so easily.

Cast
 Tang Wei as Anna
 Hyun Bin as Hoon
Jun-seong Kim as Wang Jing
James C. Burns as Steve
Jeong So-ra as Ok-ja
John Woo as Anna's husband
Danni Lang as Jiang Huang, Wang Jing's wife
Katarina Choi as Isabel

Release
The film premiered at the 2010 Toronto International Film Festival. It also screened at the 15th Busan International Film Festival, the 61st Berlin International Film Festival, and the Fribourg International Film Festival. The film was released in Korean theaters on February 17, 2011 and took  in the box office.

It became the highest grossing Korean film released in China to date, quickly gathering over 910,000 admissions after its March release, with a total box office take of more than 60 million yuan ( or ).

Awards
2011 Fribourg International Film Festival 
 Ex-Change Award by Youth Jury
 Special Mention of the Jury of the International Federation of Film Societies

2011 Baeksang Arts Awards
 Best Actress: Tang Wei

2011 Grand Bell Awards
 Best Music: Jo Seong-woo, Choi Yong-rak

2011 Korean Association of Film Critics Awards
 Best Actress: Tang Wei
 Best Music: Jo Seong-woo

2011 Busan Film Critics Awards
 Best Film 
 Best Actress: Tang Wei

2012 KOFRA Film Awards 
 Best Actress: Tang Wei

References

External links
  
 Late Autumn at Naver 
 
 
 

2010 films
South Korean romantic drama films
American romantic drama films
Films shot in Washington (state)
Films set in Seattle
Films shot in Seattle
English-language South Korean films
English-language Hong Kong films
English-language Chinese films
Chinese drama films
Hong Kong drama films
2010 romantic drama films
Remakes of South Korean films
Films directed by Kim Tae-yong
2010s English-language films
2010s American films
2010s South Korean films
2010s Hong Kong films